Events in the year 1896 in India.

Incumbents
 Empress of India – Queen Victoria
 Viceroy of India – Victor Bruce, 9th Earl of Elgin

Events
 National income - 5,333 million
 Bombay plague epidemic killed thousands
 A famine started in Bundelkhand and continued into 1897

Laws
Malabar Marriage Act, 1896

Births
29 January – Acharya Srimat Swami Pranavanandaji Maharaj, founder - Bharat Sevashram Sangha (attained Samadhi on 8 January 1941)
29 February – Morarji Desai, independence activist and 6th Prime Minister of India (died 1995).
1 September – A. C. Bhaktivedanta Swami Prabhupada, founder-acharya of the International Society for Krishna Consciousness (died 1977).
27 October – Kshetresa Chandra Chattopadhyaya, scholar of Sanskrit (died 1974).

Full date unknown
Firaq Gorakhpuri, poet (died 1982).

Deaths
 9 January – Dinkar Rao, statesman dies (born 1819)

References

Bibliography

 
India
Years of the 19th century in India